The men's 100 metres event at the 2016 African Championships in Athletics was held on 22 and 23 June in Kings Park Stadium.

Medalists

Results

Heats
Qualification: First 3 of each heat (Q) and the next 6 fastest (q) qualified for the semifinals.

Wind:Heat 1: +0.8 m/s, Heat 2: +2.0 m/s, Heat 3: +0.5 m/s, Heat 4: +2.3 m/s, Heat 5: +1.5 m/s, Heat 6: +1.6 m/s

Semifinals
Qualification: First 2 of each heat (Q) and the next 2 fastest (q) qualified for the final.

Wind:Heat 1: +1.3 m/s, Heat 2: +0.6 m/s, Heat 3: +2.1 m/s

Final
Wind: +2.4 m/s

References

2016 African Championships in Athletics
100 metres at the African Championships in Athletics